Blood Hunt is a 1995 crime novel by Ian Rankin, under the pseudonym "Jack Harvey". It is the third novel he wrote under this name.

Plot summary

Gordon Reeve, a former SAS soldier, receives a phone call in his home in Scotland, informing him that his brother Jim has been found dead in a car in San Diego - the car being locked from the inside, and the gun still in Jim's hand. While in the USA to identify the body, Gordon realises that his brother was murdered, and that the police are more than reluctant to follow any lead. Retracing Jim's final hours, he connects Jim's death with his work as a journalist, investigating a multinational chemical corporation. Soon, Gordon finds himself under surveillance, and decides to find out more among Jim's acquaintances back in Europe.

In London, he finds more hints, but no evidence for his brother's sources. After returning to his wife and son, he finds that his home has been bugged by professionals. Sending his wife and son to a relative, he determines to take on his enemy on his own. There are two parties after him: The multinational corporation, represented by "Jay", a renegade SAS member, and an international investigation corporation, somehow connected with the case.

Travelling to France, in order to find out more from a journalist colleague of Jim's, they are attacked by a group of professional killers under orders from Jay, resulting in multiple deaths, and leading to Gordon becoming a police target. Gordon decides to return to the USA, where he infiltrates the investigation corporation, and learns more about the history of the case. Then he travels to San Diego, to collect more evidence, and eventually returns to England, deliberately leaving a trail for Jay. Their long enmity leads Jay to follow Gordon to Scotland, where Gordon kills him and his team in a final showdown. Gordon manages to locate Jim's hidden journalistic material, hopefully clearing Jim's and his own name.

Connections to other Rankin books

 Gordon Reeve was the villain in Rankin's first Inspector Rebus novel, Knots and Crosses. Rankin stated on his website that he used an alternate version of Reeve as the protagonist in his last "Jack Harvey" novel to give the Harvey period a "sense of 'closure'".

References

1995 British novels
Scottish thriller novels
Novels by Ian Rankin
Works published under a pseudonym
Novels set in San Diego
Headline Publishing Group books